German submarine U-79 was a Type VIIC U-boat of the Kriegsmarine built by the Bremer Vulkan-Vegesacker Werft, Bremen-Vegesack. Her keel was laid down on 17 April 1940, by Bremer Vulkan of Bremen-Vegesack, Germany as yard number 7. She was launched on 25 January 1941 and commissioned on 13 March, with Kapitänleutnant Wolfgang Kaufmann in command until the U-boat's loss.

The boat was sunk on 23 December 1941 north of Sollum, by two British warships.

Design
German Type VIIC submarines were preceded by the shorter Type VIIB submarines. U-79 had a displacement of  when at the surface and  while submerged. She had two shafts and two  propellers.

U-79 was fitted with five  torpedo tubes (four fitted at the bow and one at the stern), fourteen torpedoes, one  SK C/35 naval gun, 220 rounds, and a  C/30 anti-aircraft gun. The boat had a complement of between forty-four and sixty.

Service history
U-79 conducted three patrols whilst serving with 1st U-boat Flotilla from 13 March 1941 to 30 September. She was then reassigned to the 23rd U-boat Flotilla from 1 October until she was sunk.

First patrol
The boat's first patrol began with her departure from Kiel on 5 June 1941. Her route took her north 'up' the North Sea and through the gap separating Iceland and the Faroe Islands toward the Atlantic Ocean.

U-79 then docked at the newly captured port of Lorient on the French Atlantic coast on 5 July.

Second and third patrols
The boat's second foray was further south than her first.

She was unsuccessfully attacked with depth charges by convoy escorts near the Portuguese coast on 12 August.

U-79s third sortie hardly left the Bay of Biscay and only lasted five days (14–18 September 1941).

Fourth and fifth patrols
Patrol number four necessitated the boat getting past the heavily defended British base at Gibraltar to reach the Mediterranean Sea which she had by 5 October 1941. She then negotiated the Straits of Messina [between Sicily and the Italian mainland] and moved toward the North African coast. She reached Salamis in Greece on 23 October 1941. However HMS Gnat was salved and returned to serve as a gun platform.

U-79 returned to the North African coast for her fifth patrol at the end of November but her luck had deserted her. She returned to Salamis with nothing to show for her efforts on 8 December.

Sixth patrol and loss
All U-79s crewmembers (44 men) survived the attack.

Wolfpacks
U-79 took part in one wolfpack, namely:
 Goeben (28 September – 5 October 1941)

Summary of raiding history

See also
 Mediterranean U-boat Campaign (World War II)

References

Notes

Citations

Bibliography

External links

German Type VIIC submarines
U-boats commissioned in 1941
U-boats sunk in 1941
U-boats sunk by depth charges
U-boats sunk by British warships
World War II submarines of Germany
World War II shipwrecks in the Mediterranean Sea
1941 ships
Ships built in Bremen (state)
Ships sunk with no fatalities
Maritime incidents in December 1941